Henry Swift may refer to:

 Henry Adoniram Swift (1823–1869), United States politician; Governor of Minnesota
 Henry Swift (photographer) (1891–1962), American photographer and member of Group f/64
 Harry Swift (medicine) (1858–1937), Australian doctor
 Harry Swift, English footballer